The lesser naked bat (Cheiromeles parvidens)  is a species of bat in the family Molossidae, the free-tailed bats. It is native to Indonesia and the Philippines.

This is a little-known species and its population status is unclear. It is known to roost in hollow trees and it feeds on insects.

References

Cheiromeles
Bats of Southeast Asia
Bats of Indonesia
Mammals of Borneo
Mammals of the Philippines
Least concern biota of Asia
Mammals described in 1921
Taxa named by Ned Hollister
Taxa named by Gerrit Smith Miller Jr.
Taxonomy articles created by Polbot